Where's Samantha? is a physics-based 2D puzzle game. It was developed by ROKiT Games and Respect Studios. The game was released on 24 March 2021, and is available on PC and Mac (Steam), Nintendo Switch, Android and iOS devices. The story revolves around two swatches of fabric (George and Samantha) that were separated by a gust of wind and are trying to reunite.

Gameplay 
There are three major characters in the game; with their own special trait.

 George - The determined one
 Frank - The tall one
 Samantha - The caring one

In Where's Samantha the player mostly plays as the character "George". However, there are levels in which you have to play using the other characters. Plus there are obstacles that can be cleared only when traits of two or more characters are combined. There are total 45 levels in the game.

References 

2021 video games
IOS games
Android (operating system) games
macOS games
Windows games
Single-player video games